Kammathep Hunsa ( lit. "Cheerful of Love")  is a Thai lakorn, the first drama in the series The Cupids, based on a novel series of the same name. It was aired every Friday–Sunday from March, 05 until March 24, 2013.

Synopsis
Hunsa (Jarinporn Joonkiat), a PR at a matchmaking company called "Cupid Hut". But she never had a boyfriend herself due to her clumsiness. One day, her boss Peem (Theeradej Wongpuapan) orders Hunsa to negotiate with Tim Pitchayatorn (Pakorn Chatborirak), a well-known businessman who is suing "Cupid Hut" over a picture of him and his brother Torn Pitchayatorn attended "Cupid Hut" party leaked to the media. Will Hunsa be able to save "Cupid Hut"?

Cast

Main
Jarinporn Joonkiat as Hunsa
Pakorn Chatborirak as Tim Pitchayatorn

Supporting
Amelia Jacobs as Suay
Anuchit Sapanpong as Pat Chatchapon
 as Khun Ying Cheun (Tim's mother)
Vasu Sangsingkeo as Niphat
 as Angie
Mintita Wattanakul as Cindy
 as Torn Pitchayatorn
 as Huiysoi (Hunsa's father)
 as Man / Minnie
 as Lieutenant Pratchawin
 as Uncle Pleo

Guest
Theeradej Wongpuapan as Peem
Araya A. Hargate as Waralee
Cris Horwang as Horm Muen Lee
Phupoom Pongpanu as Rome
Pichukkana Wongsarattanasin as Praweprao
Kannarun Wongkajornklai as Prima
 as Karakade
 as Aht / Angoon
Thikamporn Ritta-apinan as Oil / Nantisa
Nuttanicha Dungwattanawanich as Mim / Milin
Phakin Khamwilaisak as Saran
 as Pee Mongkol
 as Daniel
 as Ben
 as Peem's dad
 as Isariya Techadamrongkul (Peem's mom)

Original Soundtrack

References

External links 
 Ch3 Thailand Official Website
 Ch3 Thailand Official YouTube

2010s Thai television series
Thai drama television series
2017 Thai television series debuts
2017 Thai television series endings
Thai romance television series
Thai television soap operas
Channel 3 (Thailand) original programming
Television series by Broadcast Thai Television